Two referendums took place in San Marino on 25 May 2014. Voters were asked whether they approved of repealing laws on pensions reform and on medical practice, both of which were passed on 29 October 2013. Voters approved both proposals.

Background
Prior to the referendums, the quorum required for a proposal to be approved was reduced from 32% to 25%, meaning that 8,398 voters had to vote in favour for the proposals to be approved.

Campaign
The ruling Sammarinese Christian Democratic Party–Party of Socialists and Democrats–Popular Alliance coalition campaigned against the proposals.
The Socialist Party supported repealing the medical practice law. The Union for the Republic also supported the repeal of the medical practice law, but opposed repealing the pensions law.

Results

Repealing the pensions reform law

Medical practice

References

2014 referendums
2014
2014 in San Marino
Pension referendums
May 2014 events in Europe